Shankar–Ganesh is an Indian music director duo who has worked on Tamil, Telugu, Malayalam and Kannada movies for around 50 years.

Career

They started as assistants to Tamil music composers M. S. Viswanathan and T. K. Ramamoorthy in 1964 and later the duo assisted M.S.Viswanathan alone from 1965 till 1967. Kannadhasan started his own film Titled "Nagarathil Thirudargal" in which he introduced Shankar Ganesh as music directors. The film was stopped, so Kannadhasan took them to Chinnappa Devar and requested him to give them a chance. After Kannadhasan's death, Shankar Ganesh had their titles changed to " Kavinger vazhangiya thevarin" Shankar Ganesh

Kaveri Thanda Kalaiselvi was a Natya Nadagam (Dance Drama) wherein Jayalalitha was main lead and rehearsals used to happen at her house with all artistes and musicians coming to her house and doing practice. Shankaraman, musician duo Shankar and Ganesh used to come to play music. Sandhya used to make food and give all artistes breakfast and lunch. This went on for 28 days before the first show happened in 1965. After Jayalalitha became a huge star she recommended Devar Films to give musician duo Shankar Ganesh their debut film as a music director in the film Maharasi starring Ravinchandran with Jayalalitha.

Their first independent release was Magaraasi in 1967. Aattukara Alamelu was a turning point in their career.
Musician duo Shankar Ganesh composed music for 2 film s of Jayalalitha – Maharasi in 1967 produced by Devar Films and Vandhale Maharasi in 1973 directed by K.S.Gopalakrishnan. Their best known composition were in Naan Yen Pirenden and Idhaya Veenai.

Bomb blast
On 17 November 1986, Ganesh received an anonymous parcel by post. It contained a tape recorder with a note from the sender saying that the parcel contained a cassette with some ‘new’ music and if Ganesh liked it, he should give the sender a "break" into films. As Ganesh pressed the play button, the tape recorder exploded in his face, injuring his hands and eyes. Plastic surgery restored his hands and allowed him to play the keyboard, but he lost his vision in his right eye and had blurred vision in the left. On 1 June 2014, his vision was restored by a "glued intra ocular lens" technique.

He was also performing on the stage 50 meters away at the Congress rally in Sriperumbudur on 21 May 1991, when a human bomb killed Rajiv Gandhi.

Personal life
Shankar from the duo died prematurely, while Ganesh continued take the band forward with the name Shankar–Ganesh, and has often been credited simply as Shankar Ganesh himself. Shankar's son Balasubramaniam Shanker made his debut as a music composer through Chinni Jayanth's romantic drama film, Unakkaga Mattum (2000). Ganesh's son Shreekumar, became an actor, and later married actress Shamitha, who starred in Pandavar Bhoomi (2001).

Discography
Their works include music for the following movies:

1960s–1970s

1980s

1990s

2000s

2020s

Onscreen appearances
Ganesh made onscreen appearances in films especially playing lead role in a film called Othaiyadi Paadhaiyile (1980)
Othaiyadi Paadhaiyile (1980)
Sattam Oru Iruttarai (1981)
Pookkalai Parikkatheergal (1986)
Namma Ooru Nalla Ooru (1986)
Poovellam Kettupaar (1999)
Naai Sekar (2022)

References

External links
 
 Sankar Ganesh at MSI

Tamil film score composers
Kannada film score composers
1943 births
Living people
Tamil Nadu State Film Awards winners
Indian musical duos
Indian film score composers